Desmocollin-1 is a protein that in humans is encoded by the DSC1 gene.

The protein encoded by this gene is a calcium-dependent glycoprotein that is a member of the desmocollin subfamily of the cadherin superfamily. These desmosomal family members, along with the desmogleins, are found primarily in epithelial cells where they constitute the adhesive proteins of the desmosome cell-cell junction and are required for cell adhesion and desmosome formation. The desmosomal family members are arranged in two clusters on chromosome 18, occupying less than 650 kb combined. Alternative splicing results in two transcript variants encoding distinct isoforms.

Interactions
DSC1 has been shown to interact with Desmoglein 2.

References

Further reading